The following is a list of universities in Estonia.

Public comprehensive universities 

Tallinn University (Tallinna Ülikool)
Tallinn University of Technology (Tallinna Tehnikaülikool)
University of Tartu (Tartu Ülikool)

Public specialized universities 
Estonian Academy of Arts (Eesti Kunstiakadeemia), Tallinn
Estonian Academy of Music and Theatre (Eesti Muusika- ja Teatriakadeemia), Tallinn
Estonian Academy of Security Sciences (Sisekaitseakadeemia), Tallinn
Estonian Aviation Academy (Eesti Lennuakadeemia), Tartu-Reola
Estonian Maritime Academy (Eesti Mereakadeemia), Tallinn
Estonian National Defence College (KVÜÕA Kõrgem Sõjakool), Tartu
Estonian Public Service Academy, Tallinn
Estonian University of Life Sciences (Eesti Maaülikool), Tartu
Tallinn University of Applied Sciences (Tallinna Tehnikakõrgkool), Tallinn
Pallas University of Applied Sciences (Kõrgem Kunstikool Pallas), Tartu

Private universities 

 Estonian Business School (EBS), Tallinn

Multinational institutions 
Baltic Defence College (Balti Kaitsekolledž), Tartu

Private institutions 
Estonian School of Diplomacy (Eesti Diplomaatide Kool), Tallinn
Euroacademy (Euroakadeemia), Tallinn
Institute of Theology (Usuteaduse Instituut), Tallinn
Estonian Entrepreneurship University of Applied Sciences (Eesti Ettevõtluskõrgkool Mainor), Tartu
Tartu Academy of Theology (Tartu Teoloogia Akadeemia), Tartu
Institute of Liberal Arts, Rakvere

Unsorted
 Tallinn School of Service
 Tallinn Health Care College

See also 
Lists of universities and colleges
Lists of universities and colleges by country
List of schools in Estonia

References

 
Universities
Estonia
Estonia